The men's vault competition at the 1948 Summer Olympics was held at Earls Court Exhibition Centre on 12 and 13 August. It was the seventh appearance of the event. There were 120 competitors from 16 nations, with each nation sending a team of up to 8 gymnasts. The event was won by Paavo Aaltonen of Finland with fellow Finn Olavi Rove finishing second; the medals were the nation's first in the men's vault. There was a three-way tie for third place resulting in three bronze medals being awarded to János Mogyorósi-Klencs and Ferenc Pataki of Hungary and Leo Sotorník of Czechoslovakia.

Background

This was the seventh appearance of the event, which is one of the five apparatus events held every time there were apparatus events at the Summer Olympics (no apparatus events were held in 1900, 1908, 1912, or 1920). One of the top 10 gymnasts from 1936 returned: seventh-place finisher Michael Reusch of Switzerland. There had been no world championship yet after World War II, so the reigning two-time world champion was 40-year-old Eugen Mack, who had won Olympic gold in 1928 and silver in 1936; he did not compete.

Argentina, Cuba, Denmark, Egypt, and Mexico each made their debut in the men's vault. The United States made its sixth appearance, most of any nation, having missed only the inaugural 1896 Games.

Competition format

The gymnastics format continued to use the aggregation format. The event used a "vaulting horse" aligned parallel to the gymnast's run (rather than the modern "vaulting table" in use since 2004). Each nation entered a team of up to eight gymnasts (Cuba and Argentina had only 7; Mexico only 5), though 3 gymnasts did not compete in the vault (one each from Austria, Mexico, and the United States). All entrants in the gymnastics competitions performed both a compulsory exercise and a voluntary exercise for each apparatus, with the scores summed to give a final total. The scores in each of the six apparatus competitions were added together to give individual all-around scores; the top six individual scores on each team were summed to give a team all-around score. No separate finals were contested.

For each exercise, four judges gave scores from 0 to 10 in one-tenth point increments. The top and bottom scores were discarded and the remaining two scores summed to give the exercise total. If the two scores were sufficiently far apart, the judges would "confer" and decide on a score. Thus, exercise scores ranged from 0 to 20, apparatus scores from 0 to 40, individual totals from 0 to 240, and team scores from 0 to 1,440. For the vault, each gymnast attempted both the compulsory and voluntary vaults twice, with the better score counting.

Schedule

All times are British Summer Time (UTC+1)

Results

References

Men's vault
1948
Men's 1948
Men's events at the 1948 Summer Olympics